Trumpet Africaine: The New Beat from South Africa is the debut studio record (LP) by South African musician Hugh Masekela. It was recorded in New York City and released in August 1962 via Mercury Records. The album was released whilst Masekela was still in school.

Reception
A reviewer of Dusty Groove noted: "The jazz component of the album is quite high, and all the playing is fairly lively – which makes for a fresh album that stands out strongly in Hugh's early catalog."

Track listing

Personnel
Hugh Masekela – flugelhorn, trumpet, vocals
Hugo Montenegro – arranging, conducting
Bob Simpson – engineer
Ed Begly – tape master
Peter Perri – cover, liner photos

References

External links

 

1962 debut albums
Mercury Records albums
Hugh Masekela albums